Gangsta Party may refer to:
 Gangsta Party (album), an album by rapper Daz Dillinger
 "Gangsta Party" (2Pac song), an alternate title for the song "2 of Amerikaz Most Wanted"
 "Gangsta Party" (Joe Budden song), 2005 song
 "Gangsta Party" (Yo Gotti song)